Fairfield High School is a public secondary school located in Fairfield, California. It is one of the three high schools in the Fairfield-Suisun Unified School District, the other two being Armijo High School and Angelo Rodriguez High School.  The school serves about 1610 students in grades 9 to 12 in north-central Fairfield.

Notable alumni
Keshia Baker (2006), Olympic gold medalist
Desmond Bishop (2002), NFL player, Super Bowl Champion
Quinton Ganther (2002), NFL player
Alicia Hollowell (2002), 2008 US olympic softball player
Tracy K. Smith (1990), Pulitzer Prize winning poet
Richard Jackson (1996),choreographer and dancer for Lady Gaga
Kevin S. Tenney (1973), producer, director, writer
Sage the Gemini, rapper best known for hit songs like Red Nose and Gas Pedal
John F Campbell (1975); General, US Army, Retired; Commander of US and NATO Forces Afghanistan, Vice Chief of Staff, US Army

References

High schools in Solano County, California
Fairfield, California
Educational institutions established in 1964
1964 establishments in California
Public high schools in California